City on Lock is the second studio album by American hip hop duo City Girls. The album leaked in its entirety on June 19, 2020, whereafter it was released on June 20 by Quality Control Music, Motown Records and Capitol Records. It serves as the follow-up to their 2018 debut studio album Girl Code and features guest appearances from Yo Gotti, Doja Cat, Lil Durk and Lil Baby. The album's first single, "Jobs", was released hours before the album release alongside a music video. The album's second single, "Pussy Talk" featuring Doja Cat, was released on July 6, 2020, alongside a music video.

Recording
In September 2019, after a string of releases featuring artists like Cardi B and Lil' Kim, Yung Miami shared that she was waiting for the release of JT to start recording new music. JT previously began her prison term for credit card fraud charges in July 2018 after turning herself in to authorities. She was eventually released on October 8, 2019, having served 15 months in prison. Only a few days later, Quality Control executive Pierre Thomas announced that the duo already started recording their sophomore album and that it was slated for an early 2020 release.

Marketing 
On June 19, 2020, it was reported that the album was leaked in full to the internet. The album was subsequently released the following day.

Critical reception 

City on Lock was generally well received by music critics, upon its release. Reviewing in his Substack-published "Consumer Guide" column, Robert Christgau applauded the City Girls' "light, articulated rhymes" and declared, "What a relief to hear credible hoes rather than dubious cracklords brag about their cash on hand, to hear designer brands coveted as adornments rather than status symbols, to hear 'bitch' claimed by women rather than wielded by men." Fellow critic Tom Hull found the lyrics "over the top, but so are the trap beats". In the review for AllMusic, Fred Thomas said the album had "moments of tenderness are brief and understated, though, with the majority of City on Lock delivering amped-up, belligerent fun."

Kenan Draughorne gave the album a positive write-up for HipHopDX, claiming that "True to City Girl form, City on Lock is about scamming, tricking and full-volume boasts that simply don't hit the same without a subwoofer." The review by Pitchfork's Lakin Starling noted the growth in City Girls' experience, stating that "Yung Miami and JT come through with their signature amped-up party jams, while also making space to acknowledge what they've survived. It's a dynamic informed by their time apart during a trying period that required confidence and ambition to conquer."

Year-end lists 
Numerous publications listed City on Lock in their rankings of best albums of 2020.

Track listing

Charts

References

2020 albums
City Girls albums
Capitol Records albums
Motown albums
Quality Control Music albums